Wesley Page Watson Jr. (born September 16, 1962, in Bristol, Tennessee) died  January 4, 2021, in Wilmington, Delaware).  He was an American heavyweight boxer best known for his successful amateur boxing career.

Early years
Watson, former Howard Career Center and Dickinson High basketballer, fought of Wilmington, Delaware. He played three years of varsity basketball at Howard before transferring to Dickinson High his senior year, where he was a starter on 'Coach Jim Realer's Rams. Watson never fought officially before he joined the military in August 1981, two months after he graduated from Dickinson. "I first started boxing in April 1983," said Watson in an interview. Though his actual first fight appeared to be an unsanctioned fight against fellow Howard teammate named Arthur Carter, for which they both were being detained in the school disciplinarian's office. Lee Roy DeShazor, school disciplinarian, told, "When I walked into Lee Roy's office and saw Watson crying, I was completely shocked, and also a little disappointed," said Lee, never dreaming that a few years later Wesley Watson would surface as a national, amateur, super heavyweight boxing champion.

Charlie Messina, fight promoter manager, said Watson lived on Washington Street before joining the Army. "I remember he came to the West Center City Community Center one night and sparred against Henry Milligan," Messina said.

Military service
Wesley Watson started boxing while serving in the U.S. Army, he was stationed in Fort Bragg, his latest military rank was corporal.

Amateur career
Watson became the 1985 U.S. Army and inter-service super heavyweight champion, 1985 National AAU Super Heavyweight Champion (201 lbs. or more), representing the Army. He qualified to the All-American Boxing Team by the United States Amateur Boxing Committee. Watson qualified for the 1986 Goodwill Games, but neither he nor the remaining eight Army boxers, who qualified for the U.S. Goodwill Team, participated in the Games for non-specified political reasons.

Highlights

Unsanctioned match-up (+201 lbs), Howard Career Center, Wilmington, Delaware, 1980:
Lost to Arthur Carter
Local match-up (+201 lbs), Charlotte Speedway, Charlotte, North Carolina, June 1983 (debut):
Defeated ? by split decision, 3–2
 All-Army Championships (+201 lbs), 1984:
(no data available)
 United States Armed Forces Championships (+201 lbs), Little Creek, Virginia, November 1984:
(no data available)
USA−Argentina Duals (+201 lbs), Maude Cobb Activity Center, Longview, Texas, January 1985:
Defeated Juan Antonio Díaz (Argentina) KO 1 
National Championships (+201 lbs), Indianapolis, Indiana, November 1984:
1/2: Lost to Nathaniel Fitch by majority decision, 1−4
USA−USSR Heavy Duals (+201 lbs), Sands Hotel and Casino, Atlantic City, New Jersey, October 1985:
Defeated Valeriy Abadzhyan (Soviet Union) RSCI 2 
 All-Army Championships (+201 lbs), 1985:
(no data available)

 United States Armed Forces Championships (+201 lbs), Camp Lejeune, North Carolina, November 1985:
(no data available)
 National Championships (+201 lbs), Tulsa, Oklahoma, December 1985:
1/2: Defeated Kevin Ford RSC 2
Finals: Defeated Sinclair Babb by unanimous decision, 5–0
Local match-up (+201 lbs), 1986:
Defeated Alex García by split decision, 3–2
National Championships (+201 lbs), Civic Center, Beaumont, Texas, April 1986:
1/2: Defeated George Kilbert Pierce DQ 3 
Finals: Lost to Alex García by majority decision, 1−4 
World Champ Box-offs (+201 lbs), Caesars Tahoe, Lake Tahoe, Nevada, April 1986:
Finals: Lost to Alex García RSC 2 
District of Columbia Mayor's Cup Invitational Tournament (+201 lbs), Washington, D.C., July 1986:
Defeated Anthony Green KO 2 
USA−USSR Middle & Heavy Duals (+201 lbs), ARCO Arena, Sacramento, California, July 1986:
Lost to Aleksandr Miroshnichenko (Soviet Union) KO 1 

Watson finished his amateur career with a record of 42 wins, 7 losses. He was rated the #1 American amateur superheavyweight by the United States Amateur Boxing Federation in February 1987. He turned pro soon after being discharged from the Army.

Professional career
Watson turned pro in 1987 and won his first 10 bouts before stepping up in class and losing to Bernardo Mercado in 1988. After another string of victories he faced Michael Dokes but lost via third-round TKO. In December 1989, he fought an exhibition against Gerry Cooney. In his next fight he was TKO'd by Ray Mercer and retired. He returned to the sport five years later but retired again after two victories.

Professional boxing record

|-
|align="center" colspan=8|17 Wins (13 knockouts, 4 decisions), 3 Losses (3 knockouts, 0 decisions)
|-
| align="center" style="border-style: none none solid solid; background: #e3e3e3"|Result
| align="center" style="border-style: none none solid solid; background: #e3e3e3"|Opp Record
| align="center" style="border-style: none none solid solid; background: #e3e3e3"|Opponent
| align="center" style="border-style: none none solid solid; background: #e3e3e3"|Type
| align="center" style="border-style: none none solid solid; background: #e3e3e3"|Round
| align="center" style="border-style: none none solid solid; background: #e3e3e3"|Date
| align="center" style="border-style: none none solid solid; background: #e3e3e3"|Location
| align="center" style="border-style: none none solid solid; background: #e3e3e3"|Notes
|-
|Win
|
|align=left| Dwayne Hall
|TKO
|1
|16 Apr 1996
|align=left| Wilmington, Delaware, United States
|align=left|
|-
|Win
|
|align=left| William "Gladiator" Campudani
|KO
|1
|19 Dec 1995
|align=left| Columbia, South Carolina, United States
|align=left|
|-
|Loss
|
|align=left| "Merciless" Ray Mercer
|TKO
|5
|15 Jan 1990
|align=left| Atlantic City, New Jersey, United States
|align=left|
|-
|Loss
|
|align=left| Michael "Dynamite" Dokes
|TKO
|3
|24 Aug 1989
|align=left| New York City, United States
|align=left|
|-
|Win
|
|align=left| Anthony Green
|KO
|1
|12 Jun 1989
|align=left| Erlanger, Kentucky, United States
|align=left|
|-
|Win
|
|align=left| Randy Davis
|KO
|2
|22 May 1989
|align=left| Bowling Green, Kentucky, United States
|align=left|
|-
|Win
|
|align=left| James Holly
|KO
|2
|13 May 1989
|align=left| Bristol, Tennessee, United States
|align=left|
|-
|Win
|
|align=left| Danny Sutton
|PTS
|10
|24 Mar 1989
|align=left| Louisville, Kentucky, United States
|align=left|
|-
|Win
|
|align=left| Larry Givens
|UD
|8
|12 Nov 1988
|align=left| Bristol, Tennessee, United States
|align=left|
|-
|Loss
|
|align=left| Bernardo Mercado
|TKO
|1
|13 Aug 1988
|align=left| Bristol, Tennessee, United States
|align=left|
|-
|Win
|
|align=left| John "The Salt" Morton
|PTS
|10
|23 Jul 1988
|align=left| Bristol, Tennessee, United States
|align=left|
|-
|Win
|
|align=left| Frankie Hines
|TKO
|1
|25 Jun 1988
|align=left| Bristol, Tennessee, United States
|align=left|
|-
|Win
|
|align=left| Calvin "Concrete" Jones
|TKO
|2
|16 Jan 1988
|align=left| Bristol, Tennessee, United States
|align=left|
|-
|Win
|
|align=left| Jeff Burg
|TKO
|1
|28 Nov 1987
|align=left| Bristol, Tennessee, United States
|align=left|
|-
|Win
|
|align=left| "Mean" Joe Adams
|TKO
|3
|19 Nov 1987
|align=left| Tulsa, Oklahoma, United States
|align=left|
|-
|Win
|
|align=left| Darryl Rouse
|TKO
|4
|29 Sep 1987
|align=left| Tulsa, Oklahoma, United States
|align=left|
|-
|Win
|
|align=left| Wesley Smith
|PTS
|6
|19 Sep 1987
|align=left| Bristol, Tennessee, United States
|align=left|
|-
|Win
|
|align=left| Ray Sims
|TKO
|2
|24 Aug 1987
|align=left| Louisville, Kentucky, United States
|align=left|
|-
|Win
|
|align=left| Mark "The Spark" Green
|KO
|1
|11 Jul 1987
|align=left| Bristol, Tennessee, United States
|align=left|
|-
|Win
|
|align=left|Troy Whitehead
|KO
|1
|9 May 1987
|align=left| Bristol, Tennessee, United States
|align=left|
|}

References

External links
 

1962 births
Living people
Boxers from Tennessee
Heavyweight boxers
People from Bristol, Tennessee
American male boxers